Route 333, also known as Fogo Island Road, is a  north–south highway on Fogo Island in the Canadian province of Newfoundland and Labrador. It is the primary highway on the island, connecting all of the island's communities with the MV Veteran ferry, which in turn connects them to mainland Newfoundland and the rest of Canada. The highway is one of only two 3-digit highways in the province that use the same number, the other being Route 222.

Route description

Route 333 begins in Stag Harbour at the island's ferry terminal on the western edge of town. It heads east to pass through town before leaving and winding its along the southern coast for several kilometres. The highway now passes through Seldom-Little Seldom, where it turns due north, and heads inland for several kilometres to pass by the Fogo Aerodrome, where it has an intersection with Island Harbour Road, which provides access to Island Harbour and Deep Bay. Route 333 heads north to pass through Fogo Island Central, where it has an intersection with Route 334 (Joe Batt's Arm Road). The highway now heads northwest through rural areas for several kilometres to the island's northern coast to enter Fogo, where it comes to an end at an intersection with Main Street just east of downtown.

Major intersections

References

333